Villers-aux-Érables is a commune in the Somme department in Hauts-de-France in northern France.

Geography
The commune is situated 24 kilometres (15 mi) southeast of Amiens, on the D28 road.

Population

See also
Communes of the Somme department

References

Communes of Somme (department)